The men's sprint combination in the 2015–16 ISU Speed Skating World Cup was contested over the 500 and 1000 metre distances on a single World Cup occasion, in Stavanger, Norway, on 29–31 January 2016.

The sprint combination was a new event for the season.

Top three

Race medallists

References 

 
Men sprint combination